This article contains a list of fossil-bearing stratigraphic units in the state of North Carolina, U.S.

Sites

See also

 Paleontology in North Carolina
 Lists of fossiliferous stratigraphic units in the United States

References

 

North Carolina
Stratigraphic units
Stratigraphy of North Carolina
North Carolina geography-related lists
United States geology-related lists